Mario Jurić (born 9 February 1979) is a Croatian astronomer.

Jurić was born in Zagreb. He graduated from the University of Zagreb Faculty of Science, and received a doctorate at Princeton University in 2007. He is the Data Management Project Scientist for the Large Synoptic Survey Telescope.

Together with prolific amateur astronomer Korado Korlević, Jurić has co-discovered 125 asteroids, and one comet, 183P/Korlević-Jurić. He took part in discovery of the Sloan Great Wall, at the time the largest known structure in the Universe. His co-discovery, the Koronian asteroid 22899 Alconrad is one of the smallest known binary asteroids in the main-belt.

List of discovered minor planets

References

External links 
 Homepage
  

1979 births
Croatian astronomers
Croatian expatriates in the United States
Discoverers of asteroids
Faculty of Science, University of Zagreb alumni
Living people
Scientists from Zagreb
Princeton University alumni
Hubble Fellows